František Cipro (13 April 1947 – 7 February 2023) was a Czech football player and manager, known mostly for his work in SK Slavia Prague and SK Dynamo České Budějovice.

Playing career
Cipro played for Slavia Prague for nine years, making 232 appearances and scoring 41 goals in the league.

Coaching career
As a coach, he won the Czech First League with Slavia Prague and achieved the semifinals of the UEFA Cup in 1996.

In his first spell as manager of České Budějovice, Cipro led the club to promotion from the Czech 2. Liga to the Czech First League in 2006. He was appointed a manager with Slavia Prague on 30 March 2010, replacing Karel Jarolím. However, on 15 May 2010, following the last league game of the season, Cipro announced he was standing down from the position and returning to his role as chief scout, after just eight league games in charge.

Cipro returned to České Budějovice for his second spell in September 2011. He stayed at České Budějovice for a year before he was sacked in September 2012, with the club at the bottom of the league table.

Death
Cipro died from colon cancer on 7 February 2023, at the age of 75.

References

External links
Profile at idnes.cz 
SK Dynamo České Budějovice profile 

1947 births
2023 deaths
Czech footballers
Czech football managers
Czech expatriate football managers
Czechoslovak footballers
Czechoslovak football managers
SK Slavia Prague players
AEL Limassol managers
Expatriate football managers in Cyprus
Sportspeople from Jihlava
Czech First League managers
FC Zbrojovka Brno managers
SK Slavia Prague managers
FK Teplice managers
FC Viktoria Plzeň managers
SK Dynamo České Budějovice managers
LASK managers
Expatriate football managers in Austria
Czech expatriate sportspeople in Austria
Czechoslovak expatriate sportspeople in Cyprus
FK Chmel Blšany managers
Association footballers not categorized by position
FC Tirol Innsbruck managers
FC Fastav Zlín players
Deaths from colorectal cancer